The women's doubles Tournament at the 2006 Medibank International took place between 9 January and 14 January on the outdoor hard courts of the NSW Tennis Centre in Sydney, Australia. Corina Morariu and Rennae Stubbs won the title, defeating Virginia Ruano Pascual and Paola Suárez in the final.

Seeds

Draw

References

2006 WTA Tour
Women's Doubles